Mark Boswell may refer to:

 Mark Boswell (athlete), (born 1977), Canadian high jumper
 Mark Boswell (film director) (born 1960), American filmmaker